Obadiah Richard Toppin Jr. (born March 4, 1998) is an American professional basketball player for the New York Knicks of National Basketball Association (NBA). A power forward, he played college basketball for the Dayton Flyers.

A native of New York City, Toppin was born in the borough of Brooklyn, and graduated from Ossining High School in New York. After receiving no NCAA Division I offers, he played a postgraduate season at Mt. Zion Preparatory School in Maryland. As a freshman with the Dayton Flyers, Toppin was named Atlantic 10 Rookie of the Year after leading his team in scoring. He had breakout success in his sophomore season, earning Atlantic 10 Player of the Year and National College Player of the Year honors.

After his sophomore college season, Toppin declared for the 2020 NBA draft where he was selected with the eighth overall pick by the New York Knicks. Toppin was the winner of the 2022 NBA Slam Dunk Contest after being runner-up in the year prior.

Early life and high school career
Toppin was born in Brooklyn in New York City and originally grew up in the neighborhood of Bushwick before moving to Melbourne, Florida. He attended Heritage High School in Palm Bay as a freshman before transferring to Melbourne Central Catholic High School the next year. Toppin, his mother and younger brother relocated to Ossining, New York and he enrolled at Ossining High School going into his junior year.

He averaged 20.6 points, 8.1 rebounds, 3 assists and 3 steals as a senior during his only year playing varsity at Ossining and led the team to its first conference title in 10 years. Having received no NCAA Division I offers, Toppin opted to enroll at Mt. Zion Preparatory School in Baltimore, Maryland for a postgraduate year. He committed to play college basketball at the University of Dayton over offers from Rhode Island, Georgetown, Georgia, Texas A&M, Minnesota and Texas Tech.

College career
Toppin redshirted his true freshman season after being ruled academically ineligible to play. As a red-shirt freshman, Toppin led the Flyers with 14.4 points per game while averaging 5.6 rebounds per game and was named the Atlantic 10 Conference Rookie of the Week seven times. At the end of the season, Toppin was named the Atlantic 10 Rookie of the Year and to the first team All-Atlantic 10, the first freshman to do so since Lamar Odom in 1999. Following the end of the season he declared for the 2019 NBA draft, but did not hire an agent. After working out for several NBA teams, Toppin opted to withdraw from the draft and return to Dayton. 

Entering his red-shirt sophomore season, Toppin was named to the preseason first team All-Atlantic 10 and to the Karl Malone, Lute Olson, and Naismith Award watch lists. Toppin was also named the 44th-best collegiate basketball player going into the 2019–20 season by CBS Sports and the 24th-best prospect for the 2020 NBA draft by ESPN. He was named the Atlantic 10 Player of the Week for the first week of the season after scoring a career-high 29 points with 12 rebounds in the Flyers' season opening 86–81 win over Indiana State. In late November 2019, Toppin led Dayton to second place at the 2019 Maui Invitational Tournament, averaging 22.3 points, 7.0 rebounds, 2.3 assists and 1.3 blocks over three games. He subsequently repeated as Atlantic 10 Player of the Week and was recognized as National Player of the Week by NBC Sports. On December 30, Toppin scored a career-high 31 points in a 77–59 win over North Florida, including a school-record 10 dunks. He was named to the midseason watchlist for the Wooden Award and was named the Midseason Player of the Year by The Athletic.

Toppin sprained his left ankle during a win against UMass on January 11, 2020, but did not miss a game, scoring 24 points in Dayton's next game against VCU in spite of his injury. Toppin scored his 1,000th career point on February 22, 2020 during a 28-point performance in an 80–70 win over Duquesne. At the end of the regular season Toppin was named to the first team All-Atlantic 10 and the Atlantic 10 Conference Men's Basketball Player of the Year after averaging 20 points, 7.5 rebounds and 1.2 blocks per game with a .633 field goal percentage. Toppin was a consensus first team All-American selection, won the Karl Malone Award as the nation's top power forward, and was the consensus National Player of the Year after being named the Associated Press College Basketball Player of the Year, NABC Player of the Year, Naismith College Player of the Year, and awarded the Oscar Robertson Trophy and the John R. Wooden Award. He also garnered national player of the year honors from CBS Sports, The Athletic, NBC Sports and USA Today. After the season, Toppin announced that he would be forgoing his final two seasons of eligibility to enter the 2020 NBA draft. Toppin finished his college career with 1,096 points scored and a school-record 190 dunks.

Professional career

New York Knicks (2020–present)
On November 18, 2020, Toppin was selected with the eighth overall pick in the 2020 NBA draft by the New York Knicks. On November 23, Toppin signed his rookie scale contract with the Knicks. On December 23, Toppin made his NBA debut, putting up nine points, three rebounds, and two blocks in 24 minutes, in a 107–121 loss to the Indiana Pacers. Toppin missed 10 games due to injury sustained in his NBA debut, and returned on January 13, 2021 in a 109–116 loss to the Brooklyn Nets. He was invited to participate in the 2021 NBA Slam Dunk Contest and finished in 2nd place.

Toppin was the winner of the 2022 NBA Slam Dunk Contest, beating Juan Toscano-Anderson in the final round.

On April 8, 2022, Toppin recorded a then career-high 35 points in a 114–92 win over the Washington Wizards. On April 10, Toppin recorded a career-high 42 points in a 105–94 win over the Toronto Raptors.

Career statistics

NBA

Regular season

|-
| style="text-align:left;"| 
| style="text-align:left;"|New York
| 62 || 0 || 11.0 || .498 || .306 || .731 || 2.2 || .5 || .3 || .2 || 4.1
|-
| style="text-align:left;"| 
| style="text-align:left;"|New York
| 72 || 10 || 17.1 || .531 || .308 || .758 || 3.7 || 1.1 || .3 || .5 || 9.0
|- class="sortbottom"
| style="text-align:center;" colspan="2"|Career
| 134 || 10 || 14.3 || .521 || .307 || .753 || 3.0 || .8 || .3 || .4 || 6.7

Playoffs

|-
| style="text-align:left;"|2021
| style="text-align:left;"|New York
| 5 || 0 || 13.0 || .522 || .333 || .833 || 2.6 || .4 || .0 || .2 || 6.4
|- class="sortbottom"
| style="text-align:center;" colspan="2"|Career
| 5 || 0 || 13.0 || .522 || .333 || .833 || 2.6 || .4 || .0 || .2 || 6.4

College

|-
| style="text-align:left;"|2018–19
| style="text-align:left;"|Dayton
| 33 || 15 || 26.5 || .666 || .524 || .713 || 5.6 || 1.8 || .6 || .8 || 14.4
|-
| style="text-align:left;"|2019–20
| style="text-align:left;"|Dayton
| 31 || 31 || 31.6 || .633 || .390 || .702 || 7.5 || 2.2 || 1.0 || 1.2 || 20.0
|- class="sortbottom"
| style="text-align:center;" colspan="2"|Career
| 64 || 46 || 29.0 || .647 || .417 || .706 || 6.6 || 2.0 || .8 || 1.0 || 17.1

Personal life
Toppin's father, also named Obadiah, is of Barbadian descent and was a well-known streetball player in Brooklyn. He played basketball collegiately at Globe Institute of Technology and professionally for the Brooklyn Kings of the United States Basketball League, the Harlem Strong Dogs of the American Basketball Association and in the Dominican Republic. His father was also known as "Dunker's Delight" while playing for a streetball team called the Court Kingz. His brother, Jacob, plays college basketball for Kentucky after transferring from Rhode Island.

Toppin is a Christian and has a tattoo of a cross on his right shoulder as a sign of his faith.

References

External links

 Dayton Flyers bio
 College Statistics at Sports-Reference.com

1998 births
Living people
All-American college men's basketball players
American men's basketball players
Basketball players from New York City
Dayton Flyers men's basketball players
New York Knicks draft picks
New York Knicks players
People from Bushwick, Brooklyn
Power forwards (basketball)
Sportspeople from Brooklyn
American people of Barbadian descent